Clarence "Foots" Lewis was an American baseball shortstop in the Negro leagues.  He played with the Memphis Red Sox in 1932, four teams in 1933, and the Cleveland Red Sox and Nashville Elite Giants in 1934.

References

External links
 and Seamheads

Memphis Red Sox players
Pittsburgh Crawfords players
Akron Black Tyrites players
Cleveland Giants players
Homestead Grays players
Cleveland Red Sox players
Nashville Elite Giants players
Year of birth missing
Year of death missing
Baseball shortstops